Okulikha is a rural locality (a village) in Borovetskoye Rural Settlement, Sokolsky District, Vologda Oblast, Russia. The population was 2 as of 2002.

Geography 
Okulikha is located 8 km southwest of Sokol (the district's administrative centre) by road. Pomelnikovo is the nearest rural locality.

References 

Rural localities in Sokolsky District, Vologda Oblast